Claire Huangci (born March 22, 1990) is an American classical pianist. She lives in Frankfurt am Main.

Early life
Huangci was born in Rochester, New York to Chinese immigrant parents, both scientists. Claire started playing piano at the age of six. Until she was 11 years old, Huangci studied with pianist Ursula Ingolfsson-Fassbind at the Settlement Music School in Philadelphia. Aged 8, she won a Gold Medal at the World Piano Competition in Cincinnati, being the youngest medalist in the pre-college division to perform with an orchestra at the prize winners’ concert of the International division.

Education
Huangci was supported with scholarships from DAAD and the Deutsche Stiftung Musikleben for two years. Having completed four years of study at The Curtis Institute of Music from 2003 to 2007 where she studied together with notable pianists such as Yuja Wang under Gary Graffman, she continued her musical education in Germany at the Hochschule für Musik, Theater und Medien Hannover with Professor Arie Vardi from 2007 to 2016.

Career
Huangci won First Prize in the 2009 Europäischer Chopin Klavierwettbewerb in Darmstadt and the Orpheum Music Prize in Zurich; the First and Special Prize at the 2010 National Chopin Competition in Miami, Florida, USA, and the Second Prize at the 2011 ARD International Music Competition as its youngest participant. In 2018 she won the Concours Geza Anda in Zurich

Orchestras and performances
Huangci has appeared as a soloist performing with well-known orchestras such as the Philadelphia Orchestra, the Indianapolis Symphony, the Stuttgart Radio Symphony Orchestra under the direction of Sir Roger Norrington, the Berlin Symphony Orchestra, the Mozarteum Orchestra Salzburg, the Vancouver Symphony, the Munich Chamber Orchestra, the China Philharmonic, the Cannes Orchestre, the St. Petersburg Symphony, the Moscow Radio Symphony Orchestra, the Deutsche Streicherphilharmonie, the Brandenburgisches Staatsorchester Frankfurt, and the Santa Fe Symphony as well as the Istanbul State Symphony. She has performed in venues such as Carnegie Hall, Zürich Tonhalle, Konzerthaus Berlin, Gasteig Munich, Gewandhaus Leipzig, Salle Cortot Paris, Oji Hall in Tokyo and Symphony Hall in Osaka.
Additionally, she is a guest artist at festivals such as the Kissinger Sommer, Verbier, Ravinia, Łódź Rubinstein Festival, Menuhin Festival Gstaad, Mozartfest Würzburg and the Schwetzinger Festspiele.

Discography
In the summer of 2013, Huangci released her solo debut recording of solo works by Tchaikovsky and Prokofiev under the Berlin Classics label. She has released a second solo album in 2015 featuring sonatas by Scarlatti.

In 2019 she released a CD of concertos by Chopin and Paderewski.

References

External links
 
Queen Elisabeth Music Competition of Belgium
Yamaha Artists
15 Questions to Claire Huangci 
Audio sample from WQXR studio

1990 births
Living people
American classical pianists
American women classical pianists
Musicians from Rochester, New York
Curtis Institute of Music alumni
21st-century American women pianists
Classical musicians from New York (state)
21st-century classical pianists
21st-century American pianists